Slift (stylised as SLIFT) is a French rock band from Toulouse. The band consists of brothers Jean (guitar, vocals, synthesizers) and Rémi Fossat (bass), and their high school friend, Canek Flores (drums). Since forming in 2016, the band has released two LPs, one EP, and multiple live sessions, in addition to touring internationally in Europe and North America.

History

2016–2017: Early years and initial releases 
Slift formed after brothers Jean and Rémi Fossat met drummer Canek Flores at a classical music school. The trio began performing together in various groups before forming Slift in 2016. Their debut EP, Space is the Key, was released two years later and features a garage rock sound. In 2018, Slift released their debut album, La Planète Inexplorée, on Howlin Banana Records.

2020–present: Ummon and breakthrough success 
On 28 February 2020, the band released their third studio album, Ummon, which was met with positive critical reviews. The album showcases a stylistic transition towards a heavier, metal-inspired sound. The band was initially unable to tour in support of Ummon due to the onset of the COVID-19 pandemic and associated lockdowns. The band garnered international attention during the pandemic through widespread sharing of their debut KEXP session. In late 2022, the band embarked on their first North American tour, including performances at the Levitation and Desert Daze festivals.

Discography

Studio albums 
 La Planète Inexplorée (2018)
 Ummon (2020)

Extended plays 
 Space is the Key (2017)

Live Albums 
 Levitation Sessions (2021)

Singles 
 "The Sword" (2017)
 "Fearless Eye" (2018)
 "Ummon" (2019)
 "Hyperion" (2020)
  "Unseen" (2022)

Music videos 
 Dominator (2017)
 The Sword (2017)
 Fearless Eye (2018)
 Heavy Road (2018)
 Hyperion (2020)
 Altitude Lake (2020)
 Thousand Helmets of Gold (2021)

References

External links 
 Official Website

2016 establishments in France
English-language singers from France
French heavy metal musical groups
French progressive rock groups
French space rock musical groups
French stoner rock musical groups
Musical groups established in 2016
Musicians from Toulouse
Musical trios
Rough Trade Records artists
Sibling musical groups